Engelmannia pinnatifida  is a  North American species of flowering plants in the family Asteraceae. It is native to the southern United States and northern Mexico, the States of Chihuahua, Coahuila, Nuevo León, Tamaulipas, Texas, New Mexico

Engelmannia pinnatifida is a branching perennial herb up to 100 cm (40 inches) tall. Leaves at the base are bipinnatifid, while leaves on the stem are merely pinnatifid. The plant produces many small flower heads, generally with 8 ray florets and 40-50 disc florets.

References

External links
Photo of herbarium specimen collected in Nuevo León
Goodwell and Texhoma, Oklahoma Pasture and Roadside Plants, Engelmannia pinnatifida, Engelmann's daisy photos

Heliantheae
Flora of North America
Plants described in 1840